Peter Timothy Dusman (born 24 January 1994) is a South Sudanese footballer who plays as a midfielder for Ugandan club Doves All Stars and the South Sudan national team.

International career
Dusman capped for South Sudan at senior level during the 2019 Africa Cup of Nations qualification Group C.

References

1994 births
Living people
South Sudanese footballers
Association football midfielders
South Sudan international footballers
South Sudanese expatriate footballers

Expatriate footballers in Uganda